In enzymology, a pyruvate dehydrogenase (cytochrome) is an enzyme that catalyzes the chemical reaction

pyruvate + ferricytochrome b1 + H2O  acetate + CO2 + ferrocytochrome b1

The 3 substrates of this enzyme are pyruvate, ferricytochrome b1, and H2O, whereas its 3 products are acetate, CO2, and ferrocytochrome b1.

This enzyme belongs to the family of oxidoreductases, specifically those acting on the aldehyde or oxo group of donor with a cytochrome as acceptor.  The systematic name of this enzyme class is pyruvate:ferricytochrome-b1 oxidoreductase. Other names in common use include pyruvate dehydrogenase, pyruvic dehydrogenase, pyruvic (cytochrome b1) dehydrogenase, pyruvate:ubiquinone-8-oxidoreductase, and pyruvate oxidase (ambiguous).  This enzyme participates in pyruvate metabolism.  It has 2 cofactors: FAD,  and Thiamin diphosphate.

References

 
 

EC 1.2.2
Flavoproteins
Thiamin diphosphate enzymes
Enzymes of unknown structure